Mike Meinardus is a special effects supervisor. He was co-nominated for the Academy Award for Best Visual Effects for Kong: Skull Island.

References

External links

Visual effects supervisors
Living people
Year of birth missing (living people)
Place of birth missing (living people)